The deputy prime minister of India (IAST: Bhārat Ke Upapradhānamantri) is the second-highest ranking minister of the Union in the executive branch of the Government of India and is a senior member of the Union Council of Ministers. The office holder also deputises for the prime minister in their absence.

The office has since been only intermittently occupied, having been occupied for a little more than 10 years out of the 75 years since its inception. Since 1947 India has had 7 deputy prime ministers, of which none having at least one full term. The first was Vallabhbhai Patel of the Indian National Congress party, who was sworn in on 15 August 1947, when India gained independence from the British Raj. Serving until his death in December 1950, Patel remains India's longest-serving deputy prime minister. The post was vacant until Morarji Desai became the second deputy prime minister in 1967 and has the second-longest tenure. Morarji Desai and Charan Singh were the deputy prime ministers who later became Prime Minister of India. Jagjivan Ram and Yashwantrao Chavan became deputy prime ministers consecutively without the break in different ministries. Devi Lal is the only deputy prime minister to represent both parties in the same post. Lal Krishna Advani was the seventh and last person to serve as the deputy prime minister of India until the post became vacant.

The current government does not have a deputy prime minister and the post has been vacant since 23 May 2004.

List
Key
 Resigned
 Died in office
 Returned to office after a previous non-consecutive term

Statistics
List of deputy prime ministers by length of term

Timeline

List by party

Parties by total duration (in days) of holding Deputy Prime Minister's Office

See also
President of India
Vice President of India
Prime Minister of India
List of presidents of India
List of vice presidents of India
List of prime ministers of India

Notes

References

Indian Deputy Prime Ministers
Lists of political office-holders in India